Ünye İlçe Stadium is a multi-purpose stadium in Ünye, Turkey.  It is currently used mostly for football matches and is the home ground of Ünyespor.

The stadium currently holds 10,340 people.

References

External links
tff.org

Football venues in Turkey
Multi-purpose stadiums in Turkey